Ivankiv is an urban-type settlement in Vyshhorod Raion, Kyiv Oblast (province) of Ukraine. It is situated on the left bank of the Teteriv River. Ivankiv hosts the administration of Ivankiv settlement hromada, one of the hromadas of Ukraine. Its population was  In 2001, the population had been 10,563.

History

In the middle of the 15th century, the territory around modern Ivankiv was called "Zemlya Trudinivska" (Trudinivska Land). It was a property of Kyiv boyar Olehnja Juhnovich. In 1524 King of Poland Sigismund I the Old gave this land to Kyiv Burgess Tishko Proskura. In 1589 Ivan Proskura became the owner of this land. The town was founded in 1589 and named after Ivan Proskura. At first it was called "Ivaniv" and "Ivanivka" but later changed to "Ivankiv".
At the beginning of the 17th century, Crimean Tatars made four military campaigns on Polesia, and as a result, many people in Ivankiv were killed, taken prisoner and sold into slavery.

On 30 May 1645, the forces of Grand Crown Hetman Stanisław Koniecpolski attacked Ivankiv, which at that time belonged to Olizar Wołczkiewicz.

Until 18 July 2020, Ivankiv served as an administrative center of Ivankiv Raion. The raion was abolished that day as part of the administrative reform of Ukraine, which reduced the number of raions of Kyiv Oblast to seven. The area of Ivankiv Raion was merged into Vyshhorod Raion.

The Ivankiv Historical and Local History Museum was reportedly destroyed during the Battle of Ivankiv, a military engagement in the 2022 Russian invasion of Ukraine, leading to the loss of over twenty works by the artist Maria Prymachenko. The settlement was used by the Russian military as a ground base for reinforcement in their push towards Kyiv. BBC quoted local residents saying that the occupying Russian forces did not allow evacuation and opened fire at anyone who tried to leave the settlement. On 1 April 2022, Ukrainian forces regained control of Ivankiv.

Geography
Located in the middle of the southern area of its raion, Ivankiv lies between Kyiv and Pripyat. Ivankiv town was not as affected by the Chernobyl disaster compared to other towns.

See also
Chernobyl (city)
Chernobyl Exclusion Zone

References

External links

 Ivankiv's official website
 Ivankiv at imsu-kyiv.com

Urban-type settlements in Vyshhorod Raion
Vyshhorod Raion
Populated places established in 1589
Radomyslsky Uyezd